Dimitri Anatolyevich Riabykin is a Russian former professional ice hockey defenceman who played in the Kontinental Hockey League (KHL). He was selected by Calgary Flames in the second round (45th overall) of the 1994 NHL Entry Draft. He is currently the head coach for Avangard Omsk in the Kontinental Hockey League (KHL).

References

External links

1976 births
Living people
Avangard Omsk players
HC Dynamo Moscow players
Ice hockey people from Moscow
SKA Saint Petersburg players
Traktor Chelyabinsk players
HC Yugra players
Russian ice hockey defencemen
Calgary Flames draft picks